El niño que vino del mar is a Mexican telenovela produced by Mapat L. de Zatarain for Televisa in 1999. Starring by Imanol Landeta, Natalia Esperón and Enrique Ibáñez.

Cast

 Imanol as Felipín Rodríguez Cáceres de Rivera
 Natalia Esperón as Nisa
 Enrique Ibáñez as Eduardo Cáceres de Rivera
 Saúl Lisazo as Don Alfonso Rodríguez Cáceres de Rivera "Duque de Oriol"
 Patricia Reyes Spíndola as Alberta Gómez
 Yadhira Carrillo as Magdalena de la Soledad / Sol / Lena / Morena
 Renée Varsi as Constanza Fernandez Cadayana
 Manuel Landeta as Carlos Criail
 Sussan Taunton as Srita. Bernardette Guyón
 Orlando Miguel as Enrique Rodríguez Cáceres de Rivera
 Luz María Aguilar as Sophia Rodríguez Cáceres de Rivera
 Rolando Brito as Nazario
 Joana Brito as Rancha
 Irma Lozano as Tía Pilar Serrano
 [Sergio Ramos "El Comanche" as Omobono Tabonar "Chirimbolo"
 Luz Elena González as Jacinta
 Rafael del Villar as Marco
 Vanessa Angers as Alina
 Dacia Arcaráz as Remedios
 Emilia Carranza as Regina
 Roberto D'Amico as Óscar Serrano
 Yousi Díaz as Melda
 Edder Eloriaga as Casimiro
 Oscar Eugenio as Blasito
 Dacia González as Catalina Ortiz
 Benjamín Islas as Pedro
 Julio Mannino as Dr. Juan Manuel Ríos
 Alejandro Ruiz as Martín Morales
 Xavier Marc as Dr. Agustín Ortiz
 Iliana Montserrat as Biri
 Benjamín Rivero as Fabián
 Oscar Traven as Mr. Richardson
 María Marcela as Lala
 Nancy Patiño as Mariali
 Charly Santana as Juan Simón
 Estrella Lugo as Nely
 Óscar Morelli as Capitán del barco. 
 Anna Sobero as Dora Luz
 Héctor Cruz as Valentín  
 Mario Moreno del Moral as Miguelito
 Marcia Coutiño as Loretito
 Manrique Ferrer as Robertito

References

External links
 

Mexican telenovelas
1990 telenovelas
Televisa telenovelas
1999 Mexican television series debuts
1999 Mexican television series endings
Spanish-language telenovelas